The Amazing Race 3 is the third season of the American reality television show The Amazing Race. It featured twelve teams of two people in a race around the world.

The season premiered on CBS October 2, 2002, and ended on December 18, 2002.

Friends Flo Pesenti and Zach Behr were the winners of this season, while married parents Teri and Ian Pollack finished in second place, and brothers Ken and Gerard Duphiney finished in third.

Production
Aside from The Amazing Race 1, this is the only season in which all of the countries aside from the United States were newly visited. Filming began on August 9, 2002, and finished on September 8, 2002.

In 2003, this season of The Amazing Race won the inaugural Primetime Emmy Award for Outstanding Reality/Competition Program.

Cast
The cast of The Amazing Race 3 was increased to twelve teams and included soccer moms, law school graduates, a Vietnam War veteran, and a pair of twin models. Jill and her brother F.T. had originally applied for season 1, but after F.T was killed on September 11, John Vito & Jill applied in remembrance of him.

Future appearances
Teri & Ian and John Vito & Jill were selected to compete in The Amazing Race: All-Stars.

In 2021, Andrew Shayde appeared on Naked and Afraid and lasted 13 days in South Africa before being removed for a possible MRSA infection.

Results
The following teams are listed with their placements in each leg. Placements are listed in finishing order. 
A  placement with a dagger indicates that the team was eliminated. 
An  placement with a double-dagger indicates that the team was the last to arrive at a pit stop in a non-elimination leg. 
A  indicates that the team won the Fast Forward.

Notes

Race summary

Leg 1 (United States → Mexico)

Episode 1: "What If Our Parachute Doesn't Open?" (October 2, 2002)
Prize: A seven-night Caribbean vacation (awarded to Ken & Gerard)
Eliminated: Gina & Sylvia
Locations
Miami-Dade, Florida (Everglades National Park) (Starting Line)
 Miami → Mexico City, Mexico
Mexico City (Angel of Independence)
Mexico City (Zócalo)
Mexico City (Hotel de Cortes)
Mexico City (Plaza Santo Domingo) 
 Mexico City (Hotel de Cortes) → San José Vista Hermosa (Tequesquitengo Airfield ) 
Puente de Ixtla (Hacienda San Gabriel de las Palmas) 
Episode summary
From the Everglades, teams drove themselves to Miami International Airport, where they had to book one of two flights to Mexico City, Mexico. The first seven teams were booked on the earlier American Airlines flight, while the last five teams were booked on the later Aeroméxico flight. 
Once in Mexico City, teams had to make their way to the Angel of Independence, where they received a picture of a man named Pablo. They had to use the picture as reference in order to find him at the Zócalo, where he gave them their next clue, which directed them to the Hotel de Cortes. There, teams had to sign up for one of three charter buses leaving the next morning to an unknown destination (San José Vista Hermosa).
 This season's first Fast Forward required one team to travel to Plaza Santo Domingo and search for the one street typist out of dozens who had a "special message": the Fast Forward award. Ken & Gerard won the Fast Forward.
 This season's first Detour was a choice between Wings or Wheels. In Wheels, teams had to choose a donkey-drawn cart and use a supplied map to direct a driver, who didn't speak English, along a  course through a Mexican village in order to receive the next clue.
After completing the Detour, teams had to drive themselves to the pit stop: the Hacienda San Gabriel de las Palmas in Puente de Ixtla.

Leg 2 (Mexico)

Episode 2: "This Seems Like the Path Straight to Hell!" (October 9, 2002)
Eliminated: Tramel & Talicia
Locations
Puente de Ixtla (Hacienda San Gabriel de las Palmas) 
Mexico City (National Museum of Anthropology) 
Teotihuacan (Pyramid of the Sun)
 Mexico City → Cancún
Cancún (San Marino Marina) 
 Cancún (Las Velas Beach Club Marina)
 Playa del Carmen → Cozumel
Cozumel (Chankanaab Park) 
 Cozumel → Playa del Carmen
Tulum (Diamante K Bungalows) 
Episode summary
At the start of this leg, teams had to drive themselves to the Pyramid of the Sun in Teotihuacan and climb up to the top of the pyramid in order to retrieve their next clue, which instructed them to travel by bus to Cancún.
 This leg's Fast Forward required one team to travel to the National Museum of Anthropology and find a group of performers called the Voladores. Both team members then had to climb a  pole and swing around the pole suspended on ropes. Derek & Drew won the Fast Forward.
 This leg's Detour was a choice between Man Power or Horse Power. In Man Power, teams had to use a kayak to search a fairly small area of the lagoon for their next clue, which was hanging from a tree. In Horse Power, teams had to use a WaveRunner to search a large section of the lagoon for their next clue, which was attached to a buoy.
After completing the Detour, teams had to land their watercraft at the marina and then drive to Playa del Carmen, where they boarded a ferry to the island of Cozumel. From there, teams had to find Chankanaab Park in order to find their next clue.
 In this season's first Roadblock, one team member had to jump into the lagoon and swim with a pod of dolphins in order to receive their next clue.
Teams had to return to Playa del Carmen via ferry and then drive to the pit stop: the Diamante K Bungalows in Tulum.

Leg 3 (Mexico → England → Scotland)

Episode 3: "You Always Just Forget About Me!" (October 16, 2002)
Eliminated: Dennis & Andrew
Locations
Tulum (Diamante K Bungalows) 
 Cancún → London, England
 London → Cambridge
Duxford (Duxford Imperial War Museum) 
Cambridge (Scudamore's Punting Cambridge) 
Cambridge (Magdalene Bridge)
 Cambridge → Aberdeen, Scotland
Stonehaven (Dunnottar Castle)  
Episode summary
At the beginning of this leg, teams were instructed to fly to London, England. Once in London, teams had to travel by train to Cambridge and find their next clue outside Scudamore's Punting.
 This leg's Detour was a choice between Punt or Bike. In Punt, teams rowed a punt with only a long pole and small paddle to navigate  down the River Cam. In Bike, teams rode a tandem bicycle along a marked  course through Cambridge. After either Detour, team retrieved their next clue from under the Magdalene Bridge.
After completing the Detour, teams had to take one of three charter buses leaving the next day to Aberdeen, Scotland.
 In this leg's Roadblock, one team member had to compete in three traditional Scottish games: the caber toss, the hammer throw, and the shot put. Once they completed all three games, teams could go directly to the pit stop at Dunnottar Castle.
 This leg's Fast Forward required one team to travel to the Duxford Imperial War Museum and maneuver a tank through a battlefield obstacle course in 90 seconds or less. Dennis & Andrew won the Fast Forward and were driven to Dunnottar Castle in a limousine.
Additional notes
Dennis & Andrew had difficulty booking a flight from Mexico City to London and arrived long after the other teams. Even though they won the Fast Forward, they still arrived at Dunnottar Castle last and were eliminated.

Leg 4 (Scotland → Portugal)

Episode 4: "Did You See How I Stopped It? With My Face" (October 23, 2002)
Eliminated: Heather & Eve
Locations
Stonehaven (Dunnottar Castle) 
Stonehaven (Stonehaven Harbour)
 Aberdeen → Porto, Portugal
Vila Nova de Gaia (Calem Port Lodge) 
 Porto → Lisbon
Lisbon (Estádio do Restelo) 
Lisbon (Torre de Belém) 
Episode summary
At the start of this leg, teams had to walk to Stonehaven Harbour and search for a "message in a bottle": a bottle with their next clue on the inside label. It instructed them to fly to Porto, Portugal. Once in Portugal, teams had to make their way to the Calem Port Lodge in order to find their next clue.
 This leg's Detour was a choice between Old School or New School. In Old School, teams had to load a barrel of port wine weighing more than  onto a traditional Portuguese boat, row across the Douro River, and then deliver the wine to a restaurant. In New School, teams loaded nine crates of wine bottles onto a truck and drove them to three different restaurants. For both options, teams had to get signatures from each restaurant to prove that they made the deliveries correctly in order to receive their next clue.
After completing the Detour, teams were instructed to travel by train to Lisbon and then make their way to the Estádio do Restelo, where they found their next clue.
 In this leg's Roadblock, one team member had to enter one of the soccer goals and block one penalty kick from a Portuguese soccer player. Once the referee determined that the goal was properly blocked, teams received their next clue.
After completing the Roadblock, teams had to travel on foot to the pit stop: the Torre de Belém in Lisbon.
Additional notes
Heather & Eve were the first team to arrive at the pit stop, but they had misread the clue that told them to walk rather than take a taxi. They received a seven-minute time penalty for the advantage gained, plus an additional 30-minute penalty. Since all of the other teams arrived less than 37 minutes afterward, Heather & Eve were eliminated.

Leg 5 (Portugal → Spain → Morocco)

Episode 5: "What Happens If I Slip? Am I Just Hanging Off A Cliff?" (October 30, 2002)
Prize: Two digital cameras (awarded to Ken & Gerard)
Eliminated: Michael & Kathy
Locations
Lisbon (Torre de Belém) 
Sintra (Cabo da Roca)  
 Algeciras, Spain → Tangier, Morocco
 Tangier → Fez
Fez (Dar Dbagh Chouara Tannery) 
Fez (Borj Nord) 
Episode summary
At the start of this leg, teams were instructed to find the westernmost point of Continental Europe, which they had to figure out was Cabo da Roca, in order to find their next clue.
 This leg's Detour was a choice between Ropes or Slopes. In Ropes, teams had to take a shuttle bus to the Ursa cliffs and rappel  down to the shore below. In Slopes, teams hiked down a long trail to the same shore below. Once teams reached the shore, they could retrieve their next clue.
After completing the Detour, teams were instructed to drive to the port in Algeciras, Spain, where they then took a ferry across the Strait of Gibraltar to Tangier, Morocco. Once in Tangier, teams had to find the Viajes Flandria travel agency and sign up for charter buses to the city of Fez.
 In this leg's Roadblock, one team member had to navigate through the Dar Dbagh Chouara Tannery inside Fez's old city and search through 25 vats of dye in order to find their next clue.
After completing the Roadblock, teams drove themselves to the pit stop: the Borj Nord in Fez.
Additional notes
During the drive from Portugal to Algeciras, four of the eight teams incorrectly fueled their cars using unleaded gasoline instead of diesel, rendering the cars inoperable. Teri & Ian recovered almost immediately when Ian borrowed a siphoning line, drained the tank, and refilled with diesel; Flo & Zach found an open repair shop in the middle of the night that fixed their vehicle; Aaron & Arianne called for a tow truck and were taken to a different repair shop after a very long delay; and Kathy & Michael had the car brought back to the station, left it overnight, and became the last team to get underway with a fixed car.

Leg 6 (Morocco)

Episode 6: "I'm a Much Better Liar Than You Are" (November 13, 2002)
Prize: Two digital cameras (awarded to Teri & Ian)
Eliminated: Aaron & Arianne
Locations
Fez (Borj Nord) 
Casablanca (Hassan II Mosque) 
 Casablanca → Marrakesh
Marrakesh (Jemaa el-Fnaa Market) 
Marrakesh (Palmeraie Oasis) 
Marrakesh (Café Glacier) 
Marrakesh (Riad Catalina) 
Episode summary
At the beginning of this leg, teams had to drive themselves to the Hassan II Mosque in Casablanca, where they found their next clue. They were instructed to travel by train to Marrakesh and then make their way to the Palmeraie Oasis, where they found their next clue.
 This leg's Fast Forward required one team to look through piles of carpets in a carpet shop to find the one with the Fast Forward design sewn into it. Teri & Ian won the Fast Forward.
 This leg's Detour was a choice between Now You See It or Now You Don't. In Now You See It, teams would have chosen two horses and ridden to a route marker visible from their starting point. Once they'd reached it, they'd have dug for a clue painted on the inside of a clay pot hidden in a marked square of sand. In Now You Don't, teams chose a sand bike and rode to a route marker that wasn't visible from their starting point, where they found a clue etched on a stone. They had to make a rubbing of the clue onto a piece of paper. All teams chose to ride the sand bikes and do the stone rubbings.
After completing the Detour, teams had to translate their clue, which was written almost entirely in Arabic, in order to find their next clue at the Café Glacier.
 In this leg's Roadblock, one team member had to team up with a local food vendor and help assemble their stall and then sell five bowls of escargots in order to receive their next clue. 
Teams had to check in at the pit stop: the Riad Catalina in Marrakesh.
Additional notes
Andre & Damon were officially detained when their taxi took them far out of the way in Morocco and they encountered a local official who wanted to seize their passports. Andre & Damon refused and the show's security team had to come extricate them from the situation.

Leg 7 (Morocco → Germany & Austria)

Episode 7: "I'm Supposed to Be Indebted to Her for the Rest of the Race?!" (November 20, 2002)
Prize: Two digital cameras (awarded to Flo & Zach)
Eliminated: Andre & Damon
Locations
Marrakesh (Riad Catalina)  
 Marrakesh  Casablanca → Munich, Germany
Munich (Friedensengel )
Munich (Eisbach River) 
 Munich → Innsbruck, Austria
Innsbruck (Annasäule)
Innsbruck (Olympic Bobsled Track) 
 Innsbruck (Hungerburg Station → Seegrube Station) 
Schwangau, Germany (Schloss Bullachberg ) 
Episode summary
At the beginning of this leg, teams were instructed to fly to Munich, Germany. Once in Munich, teams had to travel to the Friedensengel, where they found a traditional children's puppet named Kasperle, who handed them their next clue. Teams were then instructed to travel by train to Innsbruck, Austria, where they found their next clue at the Annasäule.
 This leg's Fast Forward required one team to find a surfer on the Eisbach River in Munich. Once they found him, they had to attract his attention. Flo & Zach won the Fast Forward.
 This leg's Detour was a choice between Sled or Skate. In Skate, teams would have had to run a skating relay with a pair of professional ice skaters at the Olympic Ice Stadium in order to receive their next clue. All teams chose to ride the bobsled.
After completing the Detour, teams had to ride the Nordkette Cable Car to the Seegrube Station at the top of the Nordkette in order to find their next clue.
 In this leg's Roadblock, one team member had to put on safety gear and descend  to the ground on a rescue cable in order to receive their next clue.
After completing the Roadblock, teams had to drive themselves to the pit stop: the Schloss Bullachberg, located beneath Neuschwanstein Castle, in Schwangau, Germany.
Additional notes
Andre & Damon fell so far behind, due in part to their delay in the previous leg and also due to falling asleep on the train from Munich to Innsbruck and missing their stop, that all of the other teams had already checked into the pit stop before Andre & Damon even arrived at the Detour. Instead of performing the Detour, they were instructed to go directly to the pit stop for elimination.

Leg 8 (Germany → Switzerland)

Episode 8: "This Is More Important Than Your Pants Falling Down!" (November 27, 2002)
Prize: Two digital cameras (awarded to Derek & Drew)
Locations
Schwangau (Schloss Bullachberg ) 
Füssen (Augustinerhof Farm)
 Friedrichshafen → Romanshorn, Switzerland
 Romanshorn → Schaffhausen
Neuhausen am Rheinfall (Rheinfall)
 Schaffhausen → Zürich
Zürich (Lindenhof) 
 Zürich → Grindelwald
Grindelwald (Field) 
Grindelwald (Chalet Arnika) 
Episode summary
At the start of this leg, teams traveled to the Augustinerhof Farm in Füssen and searched a large haystack for their next clue. Teams were instructed to drive to Friedrichshafen and then travel by ferry to Romanshorn, Switzerland. Once in Switzerland, teams had to travel by train to Schaffhausen and then make their way to the Rheinfall.
At the Rheinfall, teams had to travel by ferry and then retrieve their clue from the top of a rocky outcropping in the middle of the waterfall. John Vito & Jill missed the first ferry to the Rheinfall, but held their ferry at the pier when they arrived, preventing the first ferry from re-docking in order to pick up all of the other teams who had arrived before them. This allowed John Vito & Jill to leave the Rheinfall first.
Teams were then instructed to travel by train to Zürich. At the Lindenhof, teams searched for a Swiss officer, who led them into a vault where they found their next clue.
 This leg's Detour was a choice between Count the Money or Run the Numbers. In Count the Money, teams had to count a large amount of Swiss currency inside of a fishbowl sitting right next to the safe. In Run the Numbers, teams had to search the streets of Zürich as far as a mile away to find three different numbers: the number on the Züri-Familie sculpture at the intersection of Sihlstrasse and Bahnhofstrasse, the sum of the numbers on the north face of a clock on St. Peter's Church, and the number of trees in Lindenhof marked with ribbons. The resulting numbers from both tasks formed the combination to the safe that contained the next clue. All teams chose to perform Run the Numbers, although Ken & Gerard did begin counting the money in the fishbowl until they gave up in frustration.
After completing the Detour, teams had to travel by train to Grindelwald and then find a route marker in a field east of the railway station in order to get their next clue.
 In this leg's Roadblock, one team member had to use a crossbow to shoot an apple off a mannequin's head in order to receive their next clue.
Teams had to check in at the pit stop: the Chalet Arnika in Grindelwald.
Additional notes
This was a non-elimination leg.

Leg 9 (Switzerland)

Episode 9: "Why Did You Have to Take Your Pants Off?" (December 4, 2002)
A seven-night Caribbean cruise (awarded to John Vito & Jill)
Locations
Grindelwald (Chalet Arnika) 
Grindelwald (Gletscherschlucht)
Saxeten (Cheese-Making Cabin) 
 Kandersteg → Goppenstein
Niouc (Val d'Anniviers – Niouc Bridge ) 
Veytaux (Château de Chillon) 
 Veytaux (Château de Chillon) → Montreux (Basset Marina)
 Montreux (Basset Marina) → Lake Geneva (Savoie) 
Episode summary
At the beginning of this leg, teams had to travel to the Gletscherschlucht. There, they had to venture into the gorge to find a key to one of the provided cars in order to receive their next clue. After retrieving their key, teams had to drive to Kandersteg, where they loaded their car onto a car train and rode through the Alps to Goppenstein.
 This season's final Fast Forward required one team to find a cheese-making cabin near Saxeten and eat enough pieces of Swiss cheese from a massive cheese wheel so as to completely reveal the Fast Forward award hidden underneath. John Vito & Jill won the Fast Forward.
 This leg's Detour was a choice between Extreme Swiss or Very Swiss. In Extreme Swiss, each team member had to walk onto a narrow bridge and take a  bungee jump into the gorge below in order to receive their next clue. In Very Swiss, teams had to drive  to a farm and then find a key inside the bell around a goat's neck in order to unlock their next clue. However, only five of the seventy-five goats had bells with keys.
After completing the Detour, teams had the option to make one phone call to their family or friends back home using a mobile phone, but they had to complete the call before heading to their next destination: the Château de Chillon in Veytaux.
 In this leg's Roadblock, one team member had to properly assemble a Swiss army bicycle from a pile of parts using an identical pre-assembled bike as a reference in order to receive their next clue.
After completing the Roadblock, teams had to ride both bikes  to the Basset Marina in Montreux. There, teams had to use a paddle boat in order to reach the pit stop aboard the steamship Savoie, which was floating on Lake Geneva.
Additional notes
This was a non-elimination leg.

Leg 10 (Switzerland → Malaysia → Singapore)

Episode 9: "Why Did You Have to Take Your Pants Off?" (December 4, 2002)
Prize: A seven-night European cruise (awarded to Derek & Drew)
Eliminated: John Vito & Jill
Locations
 Montreux → Lausanne
Lausanne (Ouchy) 
Geneva (Jet d'Eau)
 Geneva → Kuala Lumpur, Malaysia
Kuala Lumpur (Petronas Towers)
Kuala Lumpur (Ampang Park Shopping Center)
 Kuala Lumpur → Singapore
Singapore (Singapore Botanic Gardens – National Orchid Garden)
Singapore (Choa Chu Kang HDB Apartments  Singapore Zoo) 
Singapore (Suntec City – Fountain of Wealth)
Singapore (Mount Faber) 
Episode summary
During the pit stop, the steamship Savoie sailed from Montreux to Lausanne, where teams began the next leg.
At the start of this leg, teams made their way to the Jet d'Eau in Geneva, where they received a flag representing their next destination and instructions to find the Petronas Towers. Using this information, teams had to figure out that their next clue was in Kuala Lumpur, Malaysia.
At the Petronas Towers, teams had have their picture taken in front of the towers using a digital camera. Teams then had to walk  to the Ampang Park Shopping Center, where they developed their pictures and found their next clue printed on the back of the photo.
Teams were then instructed to travel by train to Singapore and make their way to the Singapore Botanic Gardens. At the National Orchid Garden, teams had to search for an orchid called "Margaret Thatcher" in order to find their next clue.
 This leg's Detour was a choice between Dry or Wet. In Dry, teams drove to an apartment block in Choa Chu Kang. From there, they had to locate Unit #10-137, where they met Singaporean TV star Gurmit Singh (from the television series Phua Chu Kang), who handed them their next clue. In Wet, teams had to drive to the Singapore Zoo and find the "Mermaids of the Sea", which referred to the zoo's manatees. Once at the manatee enclosure, they had to swim through the pool in order to receive their next clue.
At Suntec City, one team member had to perform a local good fortune ritual by running three times around the center of the Fountain of Wealth before retrieving their next clue from the middle of the fountain. Afterwards, teams had to check in at the pit stop: Mount Faber.
Additional notes
While the task at the Fountain of Wealth was presented as an ordinary task, teams were shown holding Roadblock clues. The Amazing Race chose to not present this task as a Roadblock.
Miss Singapore Universe 2001, Jaime Teo, appeared as the pit stop greeter.
Legs 9 and 10 aired back-to-back as a special two-hour episode.

Leg 11 (Singapore → Vietnam)

Episode 10: "Don't Try to Play the Moralist Now!" (December 11, 2002)
Prize: A seven-night European cruise (awarded to Teri & Ian)
Eliminated: Derek & Drew
Locations
Singapore (Mount Faber) 
 Singapore → Ho Chi Minh City, Vietnam
Ho Chi Minh City (Rex Square – Bac Ho Statue)
Cái Bè (Mekong Delta) 
Cái Bè (Cái Bè Floating Market  Cái Bè Land Market) 
Ho Chi Minh City (2A Ton Duc Thang Street) 
 Ho Chi Minh City (Café Thu Thiem) 
Episode summary
At the beginning of this leg, teams were instructed to fly to Ho Chi Minh City, Vietnam. Once there, teams had to find the Bac Ho Statue in Rex Square in order to find their next clue, which directed teams to the Mekong Delta in Cái Bè.
 This leg's Detour was a choice between Easy Buy or Hard Sell. In Easy Buy, teams chose a traditional boat called a sampan and rode it into the floating market of Cái Bè in order to find the only vendor selling water coconuts, from whom they received their next clue. In Hard Sell, teams chose a shoulder basket and carried fruit into the land market area to sell enough fruit in order to make 40,000₫ (roughly $2.50) that they had to exchange for their next clue.
 In this leg's Roadblock, one team member had to transport their teammate on a cyclo along a marked course through the streets of Ho Chi Minh City and onto a ferry across the Saigon River.
Teams had to check in at the pit stop: the Café Thu Thiem in Ho Chi Minh City.
Additional notes
All route markers in Vietnam were colored solid yellow instead of red and yellow in order to avoid confusion with the former South Vietnamese national flag, which was also red and yellow.

Leg 12 (Vietnam)

Episode 11: "They're Slithering to the Finish Line Like the Rest of Us!" (December 18, 2002)
Prize: A seven-night Alaskan cruise (awarded to Teri & Ian)
Locations
Ho Chi Minh City (Café Thu Thiem) 
 Ho Chi Minh City → Huế
Huế (Imperial City – Hiển Lâm Các Pavilion)
Da Nang (Nam Ô  – Bridge) 
 Hội An (Bach Dang Street Boat Quay → Thu Bồn River)
 Hội An (Thu Bồn River – Fishing Platform) 
Da Nang (China Beach) 
Episode summary
At the beginning of this leg, teams were instructed to travel by train to Huế. Once in Huế, teams had to search the Hiển Lâm Các Pavilion inside the Imperial City in order to find their next clue.
 This leg's Detour was a choice between Basket Boats or Basket Bikes. In Basket Boats, each team member had to cross a stretch of river in a round basket boat using only a single paddle in order to reach the clue box on a nearby island. In Basket Bikes, each team member took a bicycle laden with dozens of shrimp baskets and had to ride  in order to receive their next clue.
After completing the Detour, teams had to go to the Bach Dang Dock in Hội An and board a sampan that took them to a route marker on the Thu Bồn River.
 In this leg's Roadblock, one team member had to climb onto a fishing platform and use a wooden winch to raise a fishing net out of the water in order to retrieve the clue dangling underneath.
Teams had to check in at the pit stop: China Beach in Da Nang.
Additional notes
The Detour task involving the bicycle and shrimp baskets was later revisited in season 29 as a Switchback.
This was a non-elimination leg.

Leg 13 (Vietnam → United States)

Episode 11: "They're Slithering to the Finish Line Like the Rest of Us!" (December 18, 2002)
Winners: Flo & Zach
Second Place: Teri & Ian
Third Place: Ken & Gerard
Locations
Da Nang (China Beach) 
Da Nang (Quang Minh Temple)
 Da Nang → Hanoi
 Hanoi → Honolulu, Hawaii
Haleiwa (Puaena Point)
 Honolulu → Lihue
Wailua River State Park (Wailua Falls) 
 Lihue → Seattle, Washington
Seattle (Kerry Park)
Seattle (Seattle Center – International Fountain)
Seattle (Lincoln Park) 
Seattle (Gas Works Park) 
Episode summary
At the beginning of this leg, teams had to travel to the Quang Minh Temple in Da Nang, where they found their next clue at the Buddha's feet, which instructed them to travel by train to Hanoi and then fly to Honolulu, Hawaii. Once in Honolulu, teams had to find Puaena Point and receive a blessing from a traditional Hawaiian priest known as a kahuna, who also gave them their next clue.
Teams were instructed to fly to the island of Kauai and make their way to Wailua River State Park, where they found their next clue.
 This season's final Detour was a choice between Quick Drop or Slow Walk. In Quick Drop, teams took a quick  drop from the top of a waterfall on a zip-line. They then had to swim to shore and follow the flags to a clue behind the waterfall. In Slow Walk, teams would have walked down a much longer marked trail to the same clue box behind the waterfall. All teams chose the zip-line.
Teams were then instructed to fly to Seattle, Washington, and then make their way to Kerry Park, where they found their next clue. Teams had to travel on foot to the International Fountain at the Seattle Center in order to find their next clue, which directed teams to Lincoln Park.
 In this season's final Roadblock, one team member had to choose a totem pole and spin the animal faces so that they were aligned in chronological order based on the order that teams encountered them on the race: donkey (Mexico), dolphin (Mexico), horse (Morocco), goat (Switzerland), and manatee (Singapore). Once the animals were in the correct order, the bottom of the totem pole opened to reveal the final clue, which directed teams to the finish line at Gas Works Park. 
Additional notes
Due to Vietnamese law, teams had to book a flight at a travel agency before they could enter Noi Bai International Airport in Hanoi. 
Legs 12 and 13 aired back-to-back as a special two-hour episode.

Reception

Critical response
The Amazing Race 3 received positive reviews. Linda Holmes of Television Without Pity wrote that this season was good but was not satisfied by the ending. Dalton Ross of Entertainment Weekly praised the unpredictability of this season writing that "you never truly know what's going to happen on that show." In 2016, this season was ranked 2nd out of the first 27 seasons by the Rob Has a Podcast Amazing Race correspondents. Kareem Gantt of Screen Rant wrote that this season "thrives on team chemistry to hook a viewer in and did this cast lock in their viewers. The locations were also fantastic and the suspense was at the perfect pitch." In 2021, Jane Andrews of Gossip Cop ranked this season as the show's 6th best season.

While reviews for this season were positive, reactions to Flo Pesenti co-winning this season were largely negative. Andy Dehnart of reality blurred was negative towards the win due to Flo "threatening to quit the race repeatedly and shrieking more than a banshee with its leg stuck in a trap". Television Without Pity co-creator Tara Ariano called Flo "malingering". John Crook of the Los Angeles Times called Flo "spoiled" and "petulant".

References

External links
Official website

 03
2002 American television seasons
Television shows filmed in Florida
Television shows filmed in Mexico
Television shows filmed in England
Television shows filmed in Scotland
Television shows filmed in Portugal
Television shows filmed in Spain
Television shows filmed in Morocco
Television shows filmed in France
Television shows filmed in Germany
Television shows filmed in Austria
Television shows filmed in Switzerland
Television shows filmed in Malaysia
Television shows filmed in Singapore
Television shows filmed in Vietnam
Television shows filmed in Japan
Television shows filmed in Hawaii
Television shows filmed in Washington (state)